This is the electoral history of Tommy Douglas, the seventh premier of Saskatchewan from 1944 to 1961.

In addition to his role as premier, Douglas was a Co-operative Commonwealth Federation (CCF) member of the Legislative Assembly of Saskatchewan during the same time period for the constituency of Weyburn. Having earlier served as a CCF member of the House of Commons of Canada for Weyburn from 1935 to 1944, Douglas re-entered federal politics in 1961 when he became the first leader of the newly-created New Democratic Party (NDP). He served as an NDP member of the House of Commons of Canada from 1962 to 1968 and 1969 to 1979, and he stepped down from the role of party leader in 1971.

Overview

Provincial constituency elections 
Douglas stood for election to the Legislative Assembly in six general elections, all in the constituency of Weyburn.  He was defeated in his first election, in 1934, but was elected in the five general elections from 1944 to 1960.

1934 general election

E Elected.
X Incumbent.

1944 general election

E Elected.

1948 general election

E Elected.
X Incumbent.

1952 general election

E Elected.
X Incumbent.

1956 general election

E Elected.
X Incumbent.

1960 general election

X Elected.
X Incumbent. 
1 Rounding error.

Provincial general elections 
Douglas led the CCF in five general elections: 1944, 1948, 1952, 1956 and 1960.  He won a majority government each time.

1944 general election

The 1944 election was one of the most lopsided in Saskatchewan history.  The CCF won 47 seats in the Legislative Assembly, with the Liberals reduced to only five seats.

1 Member of the federal Parliament until shortly before the election was called;  Premier after election. 
2 Premier when election was called;  Leader of the Opposition after election.
3 Rounds to zero.

1948 general election

Douglas led the CCF in the 1948 election, and again won a majority, but with a much reduced seat count.  The Liberals made significant comeback under a new leader, Walter Tucker, but remained the Official Opposition.

1 Premier when election was called;  Premier after election. 
2 Leader of the Opposition when election was called;  Leader of the Opposition after election.

1952 general election

In his third general election, Douglas again led the CCF to a majority government, with an increased seat count from the 1948 election.  The Liberals remained the Official Opposition.

1 Premier when election was called;  Premier after election. 
2 Leader of the Opposition when election was called;  Leader of the Opposition after election.

1956 general election

In his fourth general election, Douglas again led the CCF to a majority government, with a reduced seat count from the 1952 election.  The Liberals remained the Official Opposition, with a new leader, Alexander Hamilton McDonald.

1 Premier when election was called;  Premier after election. 
2 Leader of the Opposition when election was called;  Leader of the Opposition after election.

1960 general election

In his fifth and last general election, Douglas again led the CCF to a majority government.  The Liberals remained the Official Opposition under a new leader, Ross Thatcher.

1 Premier when election was called;  Premier after election. 
2 Leader of the Saskatchewan Liberal Party without seat in the Assembly when election called;  Leader of the Opposition after election.

Federal constituency elections 
Douglas stood for election to the House of Common ten times, in two different provinces (Saskatchewan and British Columbia), and in five different ridings.  He was elected eight times and defeated twice.

1935 general election

E Elected.
X Incumbent.

1940 general election

E Elected.
X Incumbent.

1962 general election

E Elected.
X Incumbent.
1 Rounding error.

1962 by-election

The by-election was triggered by the resignation of the incumbent NDP member, Erhart Regier, to allow Douglas, the party leader, to win a seat in the House of Commons.
E Elected.

1963 general election

E Elected.
X Incumbent.

1965 general election

E Elected.
X Incumbent.

1968 general election

E Elected.
X Incumbent (before redistribution).

1969 by-election

By-election was triggered by the death of the incumbent NDP member, Colin Cameron, on July 28, 1968.
E Elected.
1 Rounding error.

1972 general election

E Elected.
X Incumbent.

Federal general elections 
In 1961, Douglas was elected the first leader of the federal New Democratic Party (NDP).  He led the NDP in four federal general elections:  1962, 1963, 1965 and 1968.  The NDP under his leadership was a smaller party in the House of Commons.

1962 general election

In his first general election as leader of the NDP, Douglas more than doubled the seats won by the NDP, winning nineteen seats, compared to the eight seats won by the CCF in the 1958 election.  Douglas was defeated in his own bid for a seat in Regina City, but won a by-election shortly afterwards in Burnaby—Coquitlam.

1  Prime Minister when election was called;  Prime Minister after election.
2  Leader of the Opposition when election was called;  Leader of the Opposition after the election.
3 Table does not include parties which received votes but did not elect any members.

1963 general election

Less than a year after the 1962 election, Diefenbaker's minority government fell on a motion of non-confidence, triggering the dissolution of Parliament and a general election.  Douglas and the NDP held steady in their seat count.

1 Leader of the Opposition when election was called;  Prime Minister after election.
2 Prime Minister when election was called;  Leader of the Opposition after the election.
3 Table does not include parties which received votes but did not elect any members.

1965 general election

After two years of minority government, Pearson called an election.  The result was another hung parliament.  The NDP came third in the seat count.

1 Prime Minister when election was called;  Prime Minister after election.
2  Leader of the Opposition when election was called;  Leader of the Opposition after the election.
3 Table does not include parties which received votes but did not elect any members.

1968 general election

In his last general election as leader, the NDP held steady in seats, but Douglas was himself defeated in his own seat. He won a by-election shortly afterward in the riding of Nanaimo—Cowichan—The Islands and re-entered Parliament.

1 Prime Minister when election was called;  Prime Minister after election.
2  Leader of the Opposition when election was called;  Leader of the Opposition after the election.
3 Table does not include parties which received votes but did not elect any members.

Party leadership conventions

1942 Saskatchewan CCF leadership convention

In 1942, Douglas challenged George Hara Williams, the leader of the Saskatchewan Section of the CCF for the provincial leadership.  He defeated Williams and became provincial leader.

1943 Saskatchewan CCF leadership challenge

In 1943, Douglas in turn was challenged for the leadership of the Saskatchewan CCF, by John Brockelbank.  Douglas defeated the challenge.

1961 Federal NDP leadership

In 1961, Douglas contested the leadership of the federal New Democratic Party, the successor to the CCF.  He defeated Hazen Argue by a vote of 1,391 to 380, to become the first leader of the party.

References

External links 
 Library of Parliament:  History of Federal Ridings since 1867

Douglas, Tommy